The naked fugitive (or naked runaway or naked youth) is an unidentified figure mentioned briefly in the Gospel of Mark, immediately after the arrest of Jesus in the Garden of Gethsemane and the fleeing of all his disciples:

The parallel accounts in the other canonical Gospels make no mention of this incident. 

The wearing of a single cloth (sindona) would not have been indecent or extraordinary, and there are many ancient accounts of how easily such garments would come loose, especially with sudden movements.

Identity
Since ancient times, many have speculated on the identity of this young man, proposing:

 Simply someone else who happened to be there.
 James the Just
 The Beloved Disciple (John)
 Mark himself
 Lazarus of Bethany
 An antitype of Joseph

It has been speculated that the fugitive represents the disciples, the linen cloth represents Jesus and the young men represent the Roman soldiers. When the young men laid hold of the cloth the fugitive abandoned the cloth and ran out of the garden naked and alone, a metaphor representing the disciples abandoning Jesus and running out of the garden spiritually naked and alone. 

Many have seen this episode as connected to a later verse in Mark: "And entering the tomb, they saw a young man sitting on the right side, dressed in a white robe," as the word for young man (νεανίσκος) occurs in Mark only in these two places.

The naked fugitive has been speculated to originate in a possible Passion narrative that pre-dates the gospel of Mark. In such an early document, anonymity of the fugitive may protect this individual from official persecution.

See also
 Mark 14
 Secret Gospel of Mark

References

Fugitives
Gospel of Mark
Nudity in religion
Passion of Jesus
People in the canonical gospels
Unnamed people of the Bible
Gethsemane